Guo Shiqiang (born 8 July 1975) is a former Chinese professional basketball player and current coach for the Guangzhou Loong Lions of the Chinese Basketball Association. He is the uncle of Guo Ailun.

Playing career 
Guo started his professional career in 1993, and spent most of his career at the Liaoning Hunters, and was a longtime member of the Chinese national team, appearing with the team at the 2000 and 2004 Olympics, as well as the 2002 FIBA World Championship.  He also helped the team win the gold medal at the ABC Championship 2003.

Managerial career 
Guo announced his retirement in 2005 at the age of 30. He stepped up as the head coach of Liaoning Hunters in 2006 after Jiang Xingquan left, and helped Liaoning Hunters to enter the semi-finals of the 2006-07 season, and further into the finals of the 2007-08 season. He also worked as the assistant coach of the Liaoning women's basketball team shortly in 2006.

In 2009, he was selected as one of the coaches for the Chinese national basketball team, together with Adjan and Min Lulei. He coached the national team for the first time at the FIBA Asia Championship 2009, guiding the team to a silver medal and a berth at the 2010 FIBA World Championship.

In 2010, he shortly returned to Liaoning, and resigned in 2011. Since 2013, he returned to his home team, now renamed Liaoning Flying Leopards, and stayed with the team until 2020. He claimed the first CBA title both for him and for the team in the 2018 season. He also sided with Liaoning in the 2017 National Games, and won the gold medal.

In June 2020, Guo decided to quit his job at Liaoning due to recent poor performance. In August, he signed with Guangzhou Loong Lions.

References

1975 births
Living people
Chinese men's basketball players
Chinese basketball coaches
Basketball players from Liaoning
Liaoning Flying Leopards players
Sportspeople from Liaoyang
Asian Games medalists in basketball
Asian Games silver medalists for China
Basketball players at the 2002 Asian Games
Medalists at the 2002 Asian Games
2002 FIBA World Championship players